Smith Middle School may refer to:

Smith Middle School (Troy, Michigan)
Smith Middle School (Chapel Hill-Carrboro, North Carolina)
Smith Middle School (Fort Hood, Texas)
Eric Smith Middle School in Ramsey, New Jersey
[[Smith Middle School (Cypress, Texas)